Huernia hystrix, the porcupine huernia, is a species of flowering plant in the family Apocynaceae, native to southeastern Africa. A succulent, it has gained the Royal Horticultural Society's Award of Garden Merit.

H. hystrix is extensively sold in Zulu markets throughout South Africa for its medicinal and protective magical properties, and in Eswatini as an aphrodisiac. Extracts from its stem and leaves have been discovered to contain biochemicals with anti-inflammatory properties, and others that may be useful in treatment of HIV/AIDS. It is highly drought-tolerant and grows well in pots, and so is a good species for ornamental xeriscaping. Destructive whole-plant harvesting has led to concerns about its survival. Researchers at University of KwaZulu-Natal Botanical Garden have discovered multiple shoots can be propagated from a single explant by treatment with Murashige and Skoog medium + 1-Naphthaleneacetic acid + 6-Benzylaminopurine with 95% survival rates.

Subtaxa
The following subspecies are accepted:
Huernia hystrix subsp. hystrix – KwaZulu-Natal, Northern Provinces, Swaziland, Mozambique, Zimbabwe
Huernia hystrix subsp. parvula (L.C.Leach) Bruyns – KwaZulu-Natal, Cape Provinces

References

hystrix
Flora of Mozambique
Flora of Zimbabwe
Flora of Swaziland
Flora of the Northern Provinces
Flora of KwaZulu-Natal
Flora of the Cape Provinces
Plants described in 1876
Taxa named by N. E. Brown
Taxa named by Joseph Dalton Hooker